The 1876 Rutlandshire by-election was fought on 17 August 1876.  The byelection was fought due to the incumbent Conservative MP, Gerard Noel, becoming First Commissioner of Works.  It was retained by the incumbent.

References

1876 elections in the United Kingdom
1876 in England
19th century in Rutland
August 1876 events
Politics of Rutland
By-elections to the Parliament of the United Kingdom in East Midlands constituencies
Unopposed ministerial by-elections to the Parliament of the United Kingdom in English constituencies